Rochel Chery (born 27 November 1982) is a French professional basketball player who played for French LNB Pro A club Le Havre during the 2002–2004 seasons.

Biography
Chery was born in Clichy-la-Garenne and is of Haitian descent.

References

French men's basketball players
French sportspeople of Haitian descent
1982 births
Living people
Small forwards
Shooting guards